Ferești may refer to the following places in Romania:

Ferești, a commune in Vaslui County
Ferești, a village in the commune Bucium, Alba County
Ferești, a village in the commune Giulești, Maramureș County
Ferești (river), a river in Vaslui County